Elisabeth Eberl (born 25 March 1988, in Graz) is an Austrian javelin thrower. She competed in the javelin throw event at the 2012 Summer Olympics.

Achievements

References

Sportspeople from Graz
Austrian female javelin throwers
1988 births
Living people
Olympic athletes of Austria
Athletes (track and field) at the 2012 Summer Olympics
Athletes (track and field) at the 2015 European Games
European Games gold medalists for Austria
European Games medalists in athletics
Universiade medalists in athletics (track and field)
Universiade bronze medalists for Austria
Competitors at the 2009 Summer Universiade
Medalists at the 2013 Summer Universiade